RRR is a 2022 Indian Telugu-language epic action drama film directed by S. S. Rajamouli, who co-wrote the film with V. Vijayendra Prasad. It was produced by D. V. V. Danayya of DVV Entertainment. The film stars N. T. Rama Rao Jr., Ram Charan, Ajay Devgn, Alia Bhatt, Shriya Saran, Samuthirakani, Ray Stevenson, Alison Doody, and Olivia Morris.

The film was released theatrically on 25 March 2022. The film grossed  worldwide, setting several box office records for an Indian film, including the third highest-grossing Indian film and second highest-grossing Telugu film worldwide.

The film has received various awards and nominations. The film was considered to be one of the best films of the year by the National Board of Review, making it only the second non-English film ever to make it to the list. With its win for Best Original Song at the 80th Golden Globe Awards, "Naatu Naatu" became the first Asian as well as the first Indian song to win the award.

Accolades

Notes

References 

Lists of accolades by Indian film
Lists of accolades by film